This is a list of Acts of the Parliament of England for the years up until 1483.

For Acts passed during the period 1707–1800 see List of Acts of the Parliament of Great Britain.  See also the List of Acts of the Parliament of Scotland, the List of Acts of the Parliament of Ireland to 1700, and the List of Acts of the Parliament of Ireland, 1701–1800.

For Acts passed from 1801 onwards see List of Acts of the Parliament of the United Kingdom.  For Acts of the devolved parliaments and assemblies in the United Kingdom, see the List of Acts of the Scottish Parliament, the List of Acts of the Northern Ireland Assembly, and the List of Acts and Measures of the National Assembly for Wales; see also the List of Acts of the Parliament of Northern Ireland.

For medieval statutes, etc. that are not considered to be Acts of Parliament, see the List of English statutes.

The number shown after each Act's title is its chapter number.  Acts are cited using this number, preceded by the year(s) of the reign during which the relevant parliamentary session was held; thus the Union with Ireland Act 1800 is cited as "39 & 40 Geo. 3 c. 67", meaning the 67th Act passed during the session that started in the 39th year of the reign of George III and which finished in the 40th year of that reign.  Note that the modern convention is to use Arabic numerals in citations (thus "41 Geo. 3" rather than "41 Geo. III"). Acts of the last session of the Parliament of Great Britain and the first session of the Parliament of the United Kingdom are both cited as "41 Geo. 3".

Acts passed by the Parliament of England did not have a short title; however, some of these Acts have subsequently been given a short title by Acts of the Parliament of the United Kingdom (such as the Short Titles Act 1896).

Acts passed by the Parliament of England were deemed to have come into effect on the first day of the session in which they were passed.  Because of this, the years given in the list below may in fact be the year before a particular Act was passed.

Richard I
1194  Capitula Itineris (Articles of the Eyre)

Henry III (to 1272)

1235 (20 Hen. 3)

Provisiones de Merton (Provisions of Merton) — commonly known as the "Statute of Merton" Act 1236 
 (Damages on writ dower) c. 1
 (Widow's bequest of corn on her land) c. 2
 (Redisseisin) c. 3
  The Commons Act 1236  c. 4  
 (Usury) c. 5
 (Wardship) cc. 6, 7
 (Limitation of writs) c. 8
 (Special bastardy) c. 9
 (Attorneys in county courts) c. 10
 (Trespassers in parks) c. 11
 Statutum Hibernie de Coheredibus (Statute of Ireland concerning Coparceners)

1252 (37 Hen. 3)

 Sententia Excommunicationis Lata in Transgressores Cartarum (Curse on Breakers of the Charters) — this instrument was traditionally cited as 38 Hen. 3
 Protestatio Regis et Magnatum

1256 (40 Hen. 3)

 Provisio de Anno Bisextili et Die (Provision for the Day in Leap Year) — this "Provision" was traditionally cited as 14 Hen. 3 but is printed in The Statutes of the Realm as 40 Hen. 3; The Statutes of the Realm also gives the year as 1256, although the Chronological Table of the Statutes gives it as 1255

1259 (43 Hen. 3)

 De Provisionibus factis per Regem & Consilium suum (Provisions made by the King and his Council) — The Statutes of the Realm gives the year as 1259, although the Chronological Table of the Statutes gives it as 1258

1266 (51 & 52 Hen. 3)

 Dictum de Kenilworth (Dictum of Kenilworth)
 Explanacio Dicti de Kenillworthe
 Addicio Dicti de Kenillworthe

1267 (52 Hen. 3)

Statutum de Marleberge (Statute of Marlborough) - the oldest piece of statute law currently extant in England and Wales
Distress Act 1267 is used to refer to c.1, c.4 and c.15
Waste Act 1267 is used to refer to c.23
(Distress) c. 1 — this Act is still in force
(Distress) c. 2
(Resisting King's officers in replevin, etc.) c. 3
(Distress) c. 4 — this chapter is still in force
(Confirmation of charters) c. 5
(Wardship) cc. 6, 7
(Redisseisin) c. 8
(Suits of court) c. 9
(Sheriff's tourns) c. 10
(Beaupleader) c. 11
(Real actions) c. 12
(Essoins) c. 13
(Juries) c. 14
(Distress) c. 15 — this chapter is still in force
(Wardships, etc.) c. 16
(Guardians in socage) c. 17
(Amercements for default of summons) c. 18
(Plea of false judgment) c. 19
(Essoins) c. 20
(Replevin) c. 21
(Freeholders) c. 22
(Waste) c. 23 — this chapter is still in force
(Inquest) c. 24
(Murder) c. 25
(Real actions) c. 26
(Benefit of clergy) c. 27
(Prelates) c. 28
(Real actions) c. 29

Edward I (1272–1307)

1275 (3 Edw. 1)

 Statute of Westminster the First (Stat. Westm. prim.):
 (Peace of the Church and the realm) c. 1
 (Benefit of clergy) c. 2
 (Escapes) c. 3
 (Wreck) c. 4
 (Freedom of election) c. 5 — this chapter is still in force
 (Amercements) c. 6
 (Purveyance) c. 7
 (Beaupleader) c. 8
 (Pursuit of felons) c. 9
 (Coroners) c. 10
 (Inquests of murder) c. 11
 (Standing mute) c. 12
 (Rape) c. 13
 (Principal and accessory) c. 14
 (Prisoners and bail) c. 15
 (Distress) cc. 16, 17
 (Fines on the county) c. 18
 (Crown debts) c. 19
 (Trespassers in parks and ponds) c. 20
 (Lands in ward) c. 21
 (Wardship) c. 22
 (Distress for debt against strangers) c. 23
 (Unlawful disseisin by escheators, etc.) c. 24
 (Champerty) c. 25
 (Extortion by officers of the Crown) c. 26
 (Extortion) c. 27
 (Maintenance) c. 28
 (Fraud) c. 29
 (Extortion) c. 30
 (Tolls in markets and murage) c. 31
 (Purveyance, Crown debts) c. 32
 (Barretors) c. 33
 (Slanderous reports) c. 34
 (Excess of jurisdiction in franchises) c. 35
 (Aids for knighthood, etc.) c. 36
 (Dissseisin with robbery, etc.) c. 37
 (Attaints in real actions) c. 38
 (Limitation of prescription) c. 39
 (Voucher to warranty) c. 40
 (Writ of right) c. 41
 (Essoins) cs. 42–44
 (Process) c. 45
 (Order of hearing pleas) c. 46
 (Real actions) c. 47
 (Land in ward) c. 48
 (Plea in dower) c. 49
 (Saving for the Crown) c. 50 — this chapter is still in force
 (Times of taking certain assizes) c. 51

1276 (4 Edw. 1)

 Officium Coronatoris (Office of the Coroner)
 Statutum de Bigamis (Statute of Bigamy) — this statute is made up of 6 chapters
 Statute of Rageman — this statute was traditionally cited as being of uncertain time (temp. incert.)

1278 (6 Edw. 1)

 Statute of Gloucester (Stat. Glouc.):
 (Franchise) part preceding c. 1
 (Recovery of damages and costs) c. 1
 (Real actions) cc. 2–4
 (Actions of waste) c. 5
 (Real actions) cc. 6, 7
 (Actions) c. 8
 (Homicide) c. 9
 (Essoins) c. 10
 (Real actions, etc.) cc. 11–14
 (Breach of assize in London) c. 15
 Exposition of the Statute of Gloucester

1279 (7 Edw. 1)

 Statut' de Viris Religiosis — this statute was traditionally cited as 7 Edw. 1 stat. 2

1281 (9 Edw. 1)

 Artic. Stat. Glouc. (Voucher to warranty in London)

1283 (11 Edw. 1)

 Statutum de Mercatoribus (Statute of Merchants) — this statute is also known as the Statute of Acton Burnell

1284 (12 Edw. 1)

 Statuta Wallie (Statutes of Wales) — also known as the "Statute of Rhuddlan"
 Statute of Rutland — this instrument was traditionally cited as 10 Edw. 1, and is not to be confused with the Statute of Rhuddlan

1285 (13 Edw. 1)

 Statute of Westminster the Second (Stat. Westm. sec.):—
 (Estates tail) c. 1 — commonly known as De donis conditionalibus; this chapter is still in force
 (Replevin) c. 2
 (Real actions) cc. 3, 4
 (Recovery of advowsons) c. 5
 (Real actions) cc. 6–9
 (Suits before justices in eyre) c. 10
 (Accountants) c. 11
 (Appeal of felony) c. 12
 (Sheriff's tourn, etc.) c. 13
 (Actions of waste) c. 14
 (Suit of infant by next friend) c. 15
 (Wardship) c. 16
 (Essoin) c. 17
 (Damages: execution) c. 18
 (Intestates' debts) c. 19
 (Real actions) cc. 20, 21
 (Actions of waste) c. 22
 (Executors; writ of accompt) c. 23
 (Real actions) cc. 24–26
 (Essoins) c. 27
 (Real actions) c. 28
 (Writs of trespass, etc.) c. 29
 (Justices of nisi prius, etc.) c. 30
 (Bills of exceptions) c. 31
 (Mortmain) c. 32
 (Forfeiture of lands) c. 33
 (Forfeiture of dower, etc.) c. 34
 (Punishment of him that taketh away a ward) c. 35
 (Procurement of suits) c. 36
 Distress Act 1285 c. 37
 (Juries) c. 38
 (Execution of process) c. 39
 (Real actions) c. 40
 (Alienation by religious houses, etc.) c. 41
 (Fees of King's Marshall) c. 42
 (Hospitallers and Templars) c. 43
 (Fees of officers on circuit) c. 44
 (Execution) c. 45
 Commons Act 1285 c. 46 — this chapter is still in force
 (Salmon preservation) c. 47
 (Real actions) c. 48
 (Maintenance and champerty) c. 49
 (Commencement of statutes) c. 50
 Statute of Winchester (Stat. Wynton.):
 (Fairs and markets in churchyards) c. 6 — this chapter was repealed by the Statute Law (Repeals) Act 1969, s. 1 and Schedule, Part II)
 Statutum Mercatorum (Statute of Merchants)
 Statutū Circumspecte Agatis (Statute of Circumspecte Agatis)
 Statuta Civitatis Lond. (Statutes of the City of London)
 Forma Confirmationis Cartarum (Form of Confirmation of Charters)

1290 (18 Edw. 1)

 Statutum domini Regis de terris vendendis & emendis (Stat. d'ni R. de t'ris, &c.) — this statute is sometimes known as the Statute of Westminster the Third, or more commonly as Quia Emptores; it was traditionally cited as 18 Edw. 1 stat. 1, and consists of 3 chapters, all of which are still in force
 Statutum de Quo Warranto (Statute of Quo Warranto)
 Statutum de Quo Warranto Novum (Another New Statute of Quo Warranto)
 Statutum de Consultatione (Statute of the Writ of Consultation) — this statute was traditionally cited as 24 Edw. 1

1292 (20 Edw. 1)

 D' Presentibz vocatis ad Warantū (Stat. de Voc. ad. War.)
 Statutum de Vasto (Statute of Waste)
 Statutum de defensione Juris. (Statute of defending Right)
  (Statute of Writs for making Inquisitions of Lands to be put in Mortmain) — this statute was traditionally cited as being of uncertain time (temp. incert.)
 De Inquisitionibus non allocandis de terris ponendis ad mortuam manum (Statute of amortising Lands) — this statute was traditionally cited as 34 Edw. 1 stat. 3

1293 (21 Edw. 1)

 Statutum de Malefactoribus in Parcis
 Statutum de Justiciariis Assignatis (Statute of the Justices of Assize) — this statute was traditionally cited as being of uncertain time (temp. incert.)
 Statutum de illis qui debent poni in Juratis & Assisis (Statute of Persons to be put in Assizes and Juries)

1295 (23 Edw. 1)

 Statutum de Frangentibus Prisonam (Statute of Breaking Prisons) — this statute was traditionally cited as 1 Edw. 2 stat. 2

1297 (25 Edw. 1)

 Magna Carta de Libertatibus Anglie, & de Libertatibus Foreste (Confirmation of Magna Carta):
 (Confirmation of liberties) c. 1 — this chapter is still in force
 (Reliefs) c. 2
 (Wardships) cc. 3, 4
 (Lands in ward and temporalities of vacant archbishoprics, etc.) c. 5
 (Marriage of heirs) c. 6
 (Widow, quarantine, dower, etc.) c. 7
 (Crown debt) c. 8
 (Confirmation of liberties) c. 9 — this chapter is still in force
 (Distress for services) c. 10
 (Common pleas) c. 11
 (Circuits) c. 12
 (Assizes of darrein presentment) c. 13
 (Amercement of freemen and others) c. 14
 (Making of bridges) c. 15
 (Obstructing of rivers) c. 16
 (Pleas of the Crown) c. 17
 (Crown debt) c. 18
 (Purveyance) c. 19
 (Castle ward) c. 20
 (Purveyance) c. 21
 (Lands of felons) c. 22
 (Suppression of wears) c. 23
 (Writ of praecipe) c. 24
 (Measures and weights) c. 25
 (Criminal writs) c. 26
 (Wardship) c. 27
 (Wager of law) c. 28
 (Criminal and civil justice) c. 29 — this chapter is still in force
 (Treatment of foreign merchants) c. 30
 (Baronies escheated to the Crown) c. 31
 (Restraint on alienation of land) c. 32
 (Custody of vacant abbeys) c. 33
 (Appeal of death) c. 34
 (Frankpledge: sheriff's tourn) c. 35
 (Mortmain) c. 36
 (Confirmation of customs and liberties) c. 37
 De Interpretatione Clausule contente in Libertatibus — note that this instrument, which is printed in The Statutes of the Realm, has been omitted from the Chronological Table of the Statutes
 Carta de Foresta (Charter of the Forest) — this charter consists of 16 chapters
 Confirmatio Cartarum (Confirmation of the Charters) — this instrument consists of 7 chapters, of which c. 6 is still in force
 Pardon to H. de Bohun, and others
 Statutum de Tallagio (Statute concerning Tallage) — this statute, which was traditionally cited as 34 Edw. 1 stat. 4, consists of 6 chapters, of which c. 1 is still in force
 Sententia lata super Confirmatione Cartarum (Sentence of the Clergy given on the Confirmation of the Charters) — this instrument was traditionally cited as 25 Edw. 1 stat. 2

1299 (27 Edw. 1)

 Statutum de Finibus Levatis (Statute of Fines) — this statute consists of 4 chapters and a part preceding c. 1
 Ordinatio de Libertatibus perquirendis — this ordinance consists of 5 chapters
 Statutum de falsa Moneta

1300 (28 Edw. 1)

 Articuli super Cartas (Articles upon the Charters):
 (Confirmation of charters) c. 1
 (Purveyance) c. 2
 (Inquests within verge, etc.) c. 3
 (Common pleas) c. 4
 (Chancery and Queen's Bench) c. 5
 (Common law writs) c. 6
 (Constable of Dover Castle) c. 7
 (Election of sheriffs) c. 8
 (Juries) c. 9
 (Embracery, etc.) c. 10
 (Champerty) c. 11
 (Distress for Crown debt) c. 12
 (Election of sheriffs) c. 13
 (Farming of bailiwicks, etc.) c. 14
 (Real actions) c. 15
 (False returns) c. 16
 (Observance of Statute of Winchester) c. 17
 (Wardship) c. 18
 (Restoration of issues of lands seized) c. 19
 (Vessels of gold, assay, etc., of) c. 20
 Statutum de Appellatis (Statute for Persons appealed)

1301 (29 Edw. 1)

 Statutum de Escaetoribus (Statute for Escheators)

1305 (33 Edw. 1)

 Ordinatio de Inquisitionibus (An Ordinance for Inquests)
 Ordinatio Foreste (An Ordinance of the Forest)
 Ordinatio de Conspiratoribus — this instrument was traditionally cited as 33 Edw. 1 stat. 2

1306 (34 Edw. 1)

 Statute of Joint Tenants (Stat. de conj. Feoffatis)
 Ordinatio Foreste (An Ordinance of the Forest)

1307 (35 Edw. 1)

 Statutum Karlioli (Statute of Carlisle)

Edward II (1307–1327)

1308 (2 Edw. 2)

1309 (3 Edw. 2)

 Statutum apud Staunford (Statute of Stamford)

1311 (5 Edw. 2)

 Les nov. Ord.

1313 (7 Edw. 2)

  (Indemnity as to death of Piers de Gaveston)
 Ne quis occasionetur (Indemnity as to return of Piers de Gaveston)
 Stat. sup. Aport. Arm. (Coming armed to Parliament) — note that this statute is still in force

1315

9 Edw. 2 Stat. 1

 Articuli Cleri (Articles for the Clergy):
 (Prohibition) cc. 1–5
 (Ecclesiastical court) c. 6
 (Excommunication) c. 7
 (Residence on benefice) c. 8
 (Distress on the clergy) c. 9
 (Privilege of sanctuary) c. 10
 (Corodies, etc.) c. 11
 (Excommunication) c. 12
 (Clergy) c. 13
 (Church) c. 14
 (Privilege of sanctuary) c. 15
 (Privilege of clergy) c. 16

9 Edw. 2 Stat. 2

 Stat. Lincoln de Vic. (Statute of Lincoln)

1316 (10 Edw. 2)

  (Pro Clero) — this instrument was traditionally cited as 3 Edw. 2

1318 (12 Edw. 2)

 Statutum Eborac' (Statute of York) — this statute consists of 6 chapters

1321 (14 Edw. 2)

 (Sheriffs; juries)

1322 (15 Edw. 2)

 Award of exile against Hugh le Despenser, father and son
 Revocation of pardon granted to the pursuers of the Despensers

1323 (15 Edw. 2)
 Revoc. nov. Ord. (Revocation of New Ordinances) — this instrument known as the Statute of York is still in force

1324

16 Edw. 2

 Statutum de forma mittendi Extractas ad Scaccarium

17 Edw. 2 Stat. 1

 Ordinacio de Statu T're Hib'n' f'ca (pro Hib.):
 (The King's officers in Ireland shall purchase no land there without the King's licence) c. 1
 (In what case only purveyance may be made in Ireland) c. 2
 (Exporting of merchandise out of Ireland) c. 3
 (Fees of a bill of grace) c. 4
 (Fee of the Marshal) c. 5
 (Pardons and protections) c. 6
 (The sealing of writs) c. 7
 (Adjournments of assizes of novel disseisin) c. 8

17 Edw. 2 Stat. 2

 De terris Templar.

Statutes of uncertain date

Certain statutes do not include within their text the date on which they were made, or are otherwise considered to be of ambiguous or uncertain date ("temp. incert.").  These statutes are known to date generally from the reigns of Henry III, Edward I, or Edward II, and are therefore printed in The Statutes of the Realm immediately after those for Edward II.

 Les Estatuz del Eschekere (The Statutes of the Exchequer) — this statute was traditionally cited as 51 Hen. 3 stat. 5
 Districciones de Scaccario — this instrument, which was traditionally cited as 51 Hen. 3 stat. 4, is still in force
 Assisa Panis et Cervisie (Assize of Bread and Ale) — this statute was traditionally cited as 51 Hen. 3 stat. 1
 Judic. Pillorie — this instrument was traditionally cited as 51 Hen. 3 stat. 6
 Statutum de Pistoribus, etc. (Statute concerning Bakers, etc.)
 Assisa de Ponderibz et Mensuris (Assize of Weights and Measures) — this statute was traditionally cited as 31 Edw. 1
 De dimissione [seu divisione] denariorum
 Statutum de Admensuratione Terre (Statute for the Measuring of Land) — this statute was traditionally cited as 33 Edw. 1 stat. 6
 Compositio Ulnarum et Perticarum (Composition of Yards and Perches) 
 Dies Communes de Banco (General Days in Bank) — this instrument was traditionally cited as 51 Hen. 3 stat. 2
 Dies Communes de Dote (General Days in Dower) — this instrument was traditionally cited as 51 Hen. 3 stat. 3
 Prohibitio formata de Statuto Articuli Cleri (A Prohibition made upon the Articles of the Clergy)
 Les Estatuz de Excestre (Statutes of Exeter)  
 Stat. sup. Vic. et Cler. (Statute concerning the Sheriff and his Clerks)
 Modu Levandi Fines (Manner of levying of Fines) — this instrument was traditionally cited as 18 Edw. 1 stat. 4
 Statut' de finibz et attornatis (Statute concerning Fines and Attorneys)
 Statutum de Conspiratoribus
 Statutum de Proteccionibz non alloc' (Statute against allowing Protections) — this statute was traditionally cited as 33 Edw. 1 stat. 1
 Modus calumpniandi Esson''' (Manner of challenging Essoins) — this instrument was traditionally cited as 12 Edw. 2 stat. 2
 Stat de visu terre, etc. Statutum de magnis Assis' et duellis (Statute concerning the Great Assizes and Battle)
 Stat. de Moneta Stat. de Moneta parvum Stat. de ten. p' legem Angl. Ne Rect. prost. Arb. Les Estatuz de la Jeuerie (Statutes of the Jews)
 Statutum de Gaveleto in London' (Statute of Gavelet in London) — this statute was traditionally cited as 10 Edw. 2
 Consuetudines Cantiae (Customs of Kent)
 Prerogativa Regis (Of the King's Prerogative) — this instrument, which was traditionally cited as 17 Edw. 2 stat. 1, consists of 18 chapters, of which the following 2 are still in force:
 Wreck of the sea c. 13
 Crown grants c. 17
 Modus faciendi Homagium et Fidelitatem (Manner of doing Homage and Fealty) — this instrument was traditionally cited as 17 Edw. 2 stat. 2
 Stat. de Ward. etc. Statutum de respectu Milit' h'endo (Statute for respiting of Knighthood) — this statute was traditionally cited as 1 Edw. 2 stat. 1
 De Catallis Felonum Statuta Armorum (Statutes of Arms)
 Statutum de Sacram'to Mi'stror' Reg' (Statute for Oaths of the King's Officers in the Eyre)
 Capitula Escaetrie (Articles of the Office of Escheator)
 Extenta Manerii (For Extending or Surveying a Manor) — this instrument was traditionally cited as 4 Edw. 1 stat. 1
 Assisa de Foresta Articuli Inquisic' super Statut' Wynton' (Articles of Inquiry upon the Statute of Winchester) — this instrument was traditionally cited as 34 Edw. 1 stat. 2
 Visus Franciplegii (View of Frankpledge)
 Le S'ement du Visconte (Oath of the Sheriff)
 Forma Juramenti' illor' de cons' R. (Form of the Oath of those of the King's Council)
 Juramentu' Ep'or' (The Oath of the Bishops)
 Juramentum Escaetorum (The Oath of Escheators)
 Juramentum Majorum et Ballivorum (The Oath of Mayor and Bailiffs)
 Abjuratio et Juramentum Latronum (The Abjuration and Oath of Thieves)

Edward III (1327–1377)

1327

1 Edw. 3 Stat. 1

 (Civil procedure, etc.) cc. 1–8

1 Edw. 3 Stat. 2

 (Confirmation of charters, etc.) c. 1
 (Forest) c. 2. Housebote and Haybote within the Forrest. Seizing of Bishop's Temporalties. 
 (King's pardon) c. 3
 (Crown debts) c. 4
 (Military service) c. 5
 (Taxation) c. 6
 (Conveyance of soldiers) c. 7
 (Beaupleader) c. 8
 (Franchises of cities, etc.) c. 9
 (Corodies, etc.) c. 10
 (Prohibition) c. 11
 (Tenure in capite, etc.) c. 12
 (Tenure in capite, etc.) c. 13
 (Maintenance) c. 14
 (Military service) c. 15
 (Justices of the Peace) c. 16
 (Indictments) c. 17

1328 (2 Edw. 3)

Statute of Northampton:
 (Confirmation of charters) c. 1
 (Pardons for felony, justices of assize, etc.) c. 2
 (Riding or going armed) c. 3
 (Sheriff) c. 4
 (Sheriff) c. 5
 (Confirmation of statutes, etc.) c. 6
 (Inquiry of past felons, etc.) c. 7
 (Commands in delay of justice) c. 8 — repealed by the Statute Law (Repeals) Act 1969, section 1 and Schedule, Part I
 (The staples) c. 9
 (Pardon of fines) c. 10
 (Common Bench) c. 11
 (Annexing hundreds to counties) c. 12
 (Process for past trespasses) c. 13
 (Measure, etc. of cloths imported) c. 14
 (Keeping of fairs) c. 15
 (Inquests) c. 16
 (Writs of deceit) c. 17

1330 (4 Edw. 3)

 (Confirmation of charters & statutes) c. 1
 (Justices of assise & gaol delivery: justices of the peace) c. 2
 (Purveyance) cc. 3, 4
 (Pardon of fines, etc.) c. 5
 (Confirmation of 35 Edw. 1. Stat. Karl.) c. 6
 (Executors' action for trespass) c. 7
 (Passages at the ports) c. 8
 c. 9
 (Receipt of offenders by sheriffs, etc.) c. 10
 (Justices of assize) c. 11
 (Assay, etc. of wines) c. 12
 (Pardons) c. 13
 (Parliament) c. 14
 (Farming of hundreds by sheriffs) c. 15

1331 (5 Edw. 3)

 (Confirmation of charters) c. 1
 (Purveyance, Marchalsea) c. 2
 (Confirmation of 35 Edw. 1 Stat. Carlisle) c. 3
 (Qualification of sheriffs) c. 4
 (Sale of wares after close of fair) c. 5
 (Attaints) cc. 6, 7
 (Custody by marshals of King's Bench) c. 8
 (Unlawful attachment, etc. forbidden) c. 9
 (Jurors) c. 10
 (Arrest: criminal procedure) c. 11
 (Outlawry) cc. 12, 13
 (Arrest, etc. of night walkers, etc.) c. 14

1335

9 Edw. 3 Stat. 1

 (Process against executors) c. 3

9 Edw. 3 Stat. 2

 (Money, gold, silver) cc. 1–11

1336 (10 Edw. 3)

10 Edw. 3 Stat. 1

 (Pardons, etc.) cc. 1–3

10 Edw. 3 Stat. 2

 (Purveyance, etc.) cc. 1–3

10 Edw. 3 Stat. 3

 (Sumptuary law)

1337 (11 Edw. 3)

 A Charter of 1337 — this charter relating to the Duchy of Cornwall is still in force
 (Wool, cloth) cc. 1–5It shall be Felony to carry any Wool out of the Realm, until it be otherwise ordained. c 1
Cloth Act 1337 c 2
Importation Act 1337 c 3
Fur Act 1337 c 4Cloth-workers may come into the King's Dominions, and have sufficient Liberties. c 5

1340

14 Edw. 3 Stat. 1

 (Confirmation of liberties) c. 1
 (Pardon of chattels of felons, etc.) c. 2
 (Pardon of Crown debts) c. 3
 Engleschrie Act 1340 c. 4
 (Delays in courts) c. 5. Commissioners appointed to redress Delays etc. of Courts of Justice.
 (Amendment of records) c. 6
 (Appointment of sheriffs) c. 7
 (Escheators and coroners) c. 8
 (Annexing hundreds to counties) c. 9
 (Custody of gaols, etc.) c. 10
 (Clerks of statutes merchant) c. 11
 (Measures and weights) c. 12
 (Tenure in capite) c. 13
 (Petition for lands in King's hand) c. 14
 (Pardon for felony) c. 15
 (Nisi prius) c. 16
 (Real actions) cc. 17, 18
 (Purveyance) c. 19
 (Taxation) c. 20
 (Taxation, etc.) c. 21

14 Edw. 3 Stat. 2

 (Taxation, etc.) cc. 1, 2

14 Edw. 3 Stat. 3

 (Denial of subjection of England to Kings of France)

14 Edw. 3 Stat. 4

 (Purveyance, presentation to church and bishop's temporalities) cc. 1–5

1341

15 Edw. 3 Stat. 1

 (Trial of peers, etc.) cc. 1–6

15 Edw. 3 Stat. 2

 (Repeal of 15 Edw. 3. Stat. 1)

15 Edw. 3 Stat. 3

 (Subsidy) cc. 1–7

1343 (17 Edw. 3)

 (Money, silver)

1344

18 Edw. 3 Stat. 1

 (Concerning exigents)

18 Edw. 3 Stat. 2

 (Taxation) part preceding c. 1
 (Commissions of new enquiries) c. 1
 (Justice of the Peace) c. 2
 (Freedom of trade) c. 3
 (Weights and measures) c. 4
 (No exigents in trespass) c. 5
 (Currency) c. 6
 (Confirmation of statutes, etc.) c. 7

18 Edw. 3 Stat. 3

 (Exemption of prelates from secular jurisdiction) c. 1
 (Bigamy) c. 2
 (Mortmain) c. 3
 (Purveyance) c. 4
 (Prohibitions) c. 5
 (Spiritual jurisdiction) c. 6
 (Scire facias for tithes) c. 7

1346 (20 Edw. 3)

 Ordinance for the Justices cc. 1–6
 (Oath of the justices) — this instrument was traditionally cited as 18 Edw. 3 stat. 4
 (Oath of the Clerks of Chancery) — this instrument was traditionally cited as 18 Edw. 3 stat. 5

1349 (23 Edw. 3)

 Statute of Labourers 1349 cc. 1–8

1350

25 Edw. 3 Stat. 1

 (Status of children born abroad) — this statute, which was traditionally cited as 25 Edw. 3 stat. 2, is still in force

25 Edw. 3 Stat. 2

 (Labourers, artificers, etc.) cc. 1–7 — this statute was traditionally cited as 25 Edw. 3 stat. 1

25 Edw. 3 Stat. 3

 (Aulneger, foreign and other merchants, forestalling, weirs) cc. 1–4 — this statute was traditionally cited as 25 Edw. 3 stat. 4

25 Edw. 3 Stat. 4

 Statute of Provisors of Benefices — this statute was traditionally cited as 25 Edw. 3 stat. 6

1351

25 Edw. 3 Stat. 5

 (Purveyance)  c. 1
 Treason Act 1351 c. 2 — this chapter is still in force
 (Challenge of jurors) c. 3
 (Criminal and civil justice) c. 4 — this chapter is still in force
 (Executors of executors) c. 5
 (Purveyance)  c. 6
 (Exactions by keepers of forests, etc.) c. 7
 (Finding of men at arms) c. 8
 (Weights) c. 9
 (Measures) c. 10
 (Aids) c. 11
 (Exchange of gold and silver) c. 12
 (Gold and silver coin) c. 13
 (Process against persons indicted of felony) c. 14
 (Purveyance)  c. 15
 (Real actions) c. 16
 (Process of exigent) c. 17
 (Villainage) c. 18
 (Crown debtors) c. 19
 (Coinage) c. 20
 (Purveyance)  c. 21
 (Provisors) c. 22
 (Lombards) c. 23

25 Edw. 3 Stat. 6

 An Ordinance for the Clergy:
 (Confirmation of privileges of clergy) c. 1
 (Repeal of 14 Edw. 3 Stat. 4. c. 2) c. 2
 (Presentation to benefices by the King) c. 3
 (Benefit of clergy) cc. 4, 5
 (Temporalities of prelates) c. 6
 (King's title to benefice) c. 7
 (Cognizance of avoidance of benefices) c. 8
 (Indictments of ordinaries for extortion) c. 9

25 Edw. 3 Stat. 7

 Statutum de Forma levationis Decime-quinte (Statute of the Form of levying of the Fifteenth)

25 Edw. 3 (Artic. p. Clero. resp.)

 (This Article for the Clergy is respited until the next Parliament)

1353

27 Edw. 3 Stat. 1

 A Statute against Anullers of Judgments of the King's Court:
 (Suing in foreign court) c. 1
 (Pardon) c. 2
 (Regrators) c. 3
 (Cloths) c. 4
 (Forestallers) c. 5
 (Buying of wines) c. 7
 (Importation of wine) c. 6
 (Gauging of wines) c. 8

27 Edw. 3 Stat. 2

 Ordinance of the Staples 1353 cc. 1–28

27 Edw. 3 (Ordin. de feodis Majorum)

 (Fees of mayors, etc. of staples)

1354 (28 Edw. 3)

 (Confirmation of charters, etc.) c. 1
 (Lords of Marches of Wales) c. 2
 (Liberty of subject) c. 3 (still in force)
 (Tenure in capite) c. 4
 (Exportation of iron) c. 5
 (Election of coroners) c. 6
 (Sheriffs) c. 7
 (Attaint) c. 8
 (Sheriffs) c. 9
 (Misprisions in cities and boroughs) c. 10
 (Confirmation, etc. of 13 Edw. 1 Stat. Wynton. cc. 1, 2) c. 11
 (Purveyance) c. 12
 (Confirmation, etc. of 27 Edw. 3 Stat. 2) c. 13
 (The staple) cc. 14, 15

1357

31 Edw. 3 Stat. 1

 (Confirmation of charters) c. 1
 (Wool) c. 2
 (Discharge of extreats of felon's goods) c. 3
 (Probate of testaments) c. 4
 (Wine) c. 5
 (Franchises) c. 6
 (The Statute of Labourers, the staple) c. 7
 (Wool) c. 8
 (Wool) c. 9
 (Default of victuallers in London) c. 10
 (Administration on intestacy) c. 11
 (Exchequer Chamber) c. 12
 (Pardon, taxation) c. 13
 (Levy of escapes of thieves, etc.) c. 14
 (Sheriff's tourn) c. 15

31 Edw. 3 Stat. 2

 (Herrings: salt fish of Blakeney) cc. 1–3

31 Edw. 3 Stat. 3

 (Herrings: salt fish of Blakeney) cc. 1, 2

31 Edw. 3 Stat. 4

 An Ordinance made for the Estate of the Land of Ireland cc. 1–19

1360 (34 Edw. 3)

 Justices of the Peace Act 1361 c. 1 (still in force)
 (Purveyance) cc. 2, 3
 (Juries) c. 4
 (Weights and measures) c. 5
 (Measures) c. 6
 (Attaint) c. 7
 (Juries) c. 8
 (Labourers) cc. 9–11
 (Forfeitures) c. 12
 (Escheators) cc. 13, 14
 (Confirmation of grants) c. 15
 (Fines) c. 16
 (Trade, etc. with Ireland) cc. 17, 18
 (Customs) c. 19
 Exportation of Corn Act 1360
 (Exportation of wool, etc.) c. 21
 (Finding of hawks) c. 22

1361 (35 Edw. 3)

 (Herrings)

1362

36 Edw. 3 Stat. 1

 (Confirmation of charters, etc.) c. 1
 (Purveyance) cc. 2–6
 (The staple) c. 7
 (Wages of priests) c. 8
 (Breaches of statutes) c. 9
 (Parliament) c. 10
 (Customs, exportation) c. 11
 (Quarter sessions) c. 12
 (Escheaters) c. 13
 (Appropriation of certain fines, etc.) c. 14
 Pleading in English Act 1362 c. 15

36 Edw. 3 Stat. 2
 Of the Pardon made to the Commonalty of the Realm of England

1363

37 Edw. 3

 Statut' de Victu et Vestitu (Statute concerning Diet and Apparel) cc. 1–19

38 Edw. 3 Stat. 1

 (Gold and silver, fines, merchants, jurors, etc.) cc. 1–12

38 Edw. 3 Stat. 2

 (Obtaining benefices from Rome) cc. 1–4

1368 (42 Edw. 3)

This Statute says that it was made at Westminster on 1 May 1368: see Halsbury's Statutes.

 (Confirmation of charters) c. 1 — repealed for England and Wales by the Statute Law Revision Act 1863, and for Ireland by the Statute Law (Ireland) Revision Act 1872
 (Confirmation of pardon) c. 2 — repealed for England and Wales by the Statute Law Revision Act 1863, and for Ireland by the Statute Law (Ireland) Revision Act 1872
 (Observance of due process of law) c. 3 — this chapter is still in force
 (Commission of inquiry) c. 4 — repealed by the Statute Law Revision Act 1948
 (Escheators) c. 5 — repealed for England and Wales by the Statute Law Revision Act 1863, and for Ireland by the Statute Law (Ireland) Revision Act 1872
 (Labourers) c. 6 — repealed for England and Wales by the Statute Law Revision Act 1863, and for Ireland by the Statute Law (Ireland) Revision Act 1872
 (Londoners) c. 7 — repealed for England and Wales by the Statute Law Revision Act 1863, and for Ireland by the Statute Law (Ireland) Revision Act 1872
 (Importation of wine) c. 8 — repealed for England and Wales by the Statute Law Revision Act 1863, and for Ireland by the Statute Law (Ireland) Revision Act 1872
 (Crown debts, etc.) c. 9 — repealed for England and Wales by the Statute Law Revision Act 1863, and for Ireland by the Statute Law (Ireland) Revision Act 1872
 (Naturalization) c. 10 — repealed by the British Nationality and Status of Aliens Act 1914, s. 28 and Sch. 3
 (Return of jurors' names at nisi prius) c. 11 — repealed by the Statute Law Revision Act 1948

1369 (43 Edw. 3)

 (The staple trade with Gascony, pardon) cc. 1–4

1371 (45 Edw. 3)

 (Confirmation of charters, weirs, prohibition to spiritual courts, taxation) cc. 1–4

1372 (46 Edw. 3)

 (Knights of the shire)

1373 (47 Edw. 3)

 (Cloth, currency) cc. 1, 2

1376 (50 Edw. 3)

 (Confirmation of liberties and charters, pardon, arrest of clergy, fraudulent conveyances, cloth) cc. 1–8

Richard II (1377–1399)

1377 (1 Ric. 2)

 (Confirmation of charters, etc.) c. 1
 (Peace of the realm, etc.) c. 2
 (Purveyance) c. 3
 (Penalties for maintenance) c. 4
 (Officers of the Exchequer) c. 5
 (Villanies) c. 6
 (Maintenance) c. 7
 (Protections) c. 8
 (Maintenance, etc.) c. 9
 (Confirmation of pardons) c. 10
 (Sheriffs (re-appointment)) c. 11
 (Suits in spiritual courts) c. 13
 (Prisoners for debt) c. 12
 (Tithes) c. 14
 (Arrest of clergy) c. 15

1378 (2 Ric. 2 Stat. 1)

 Scandalum magnatum (Merchants, confirmation of statutes, penalty for slandering great men, etc.) cc. 1–8

1379

2 Ric. 2 Stat. 2

 (Riots, fraudulent deeds, etc.) cc. 1–3

3 Ric. 2

 (Confirmation of liberties, etc.) c. 1
 (Assize of cloths) c. 2
 (Farming of benefices for aliens) c. 3

1380 (4 Ric. 2)

 (Gauging of vessels of wine, etc.) c. 1
 (Pardon) c. 2

1381 (5 Ric. 2 Stat. 1)

 (Confirmation of liberties, charters and statutes, exportation of gold, silver, leaving the realm, etc.) cc. 1–5, 8–16 — repealed for England and Wales by the Statute Law Revision Act 1863, and for Ireland by the Statute Law (Ireland) Revision Act 1872
 Treason Act 1381 c. 6 – repealed by 1 Hen.4 c. 10.
 Forcible Entry Act 1381 c. 7 — repealed for England and Wales by the Criminal Law Act 1977

1382

5 Ric. 2 Stat. 2

 (Merchant strangers, leather, subsidy, heresy) cc. 1–3, 5
 (Summons to Parliament) c. 4 — this chapter is still in force

6 Ric. 2 Stat. 1

 (Confirmation of liberties, charters and statutes, venue in actions for debt, legal proceedings, rape, etc.) cc. 1–13

1383

6 Ric. 2 Stat. 2

 (Pardon, purveyance, trespass, etc.) cc. 1–5

7 Ric. 2

 (Confirmation of liberties) c. 1
 (Confirmation of statutes) c. 2
 (Forest) cc. 3, 4
 Vagabonds Act 1383 c. 5
 (Confirmation of Statute of Winchester) c. 6
 (Jurors) c. 7
 (Purveyance) c. 8
 (Cloths) c. 9
 (Real actions) c. 10
 (Repeal of certain statutes) c. 11
 (Holding of benefices by aliens) c. 12
 (Riding armed) c. 13
 (Attorneys in writs of premunire) c. 14
 (Maintenance, etc.) c. 15
 (Exportation to Scotland) c. 16
 (Mainpernors) c. 17

1384 (8 Ric. 2)

 (Confirmation of liberties, etc.) c. 1
 (Justices of assize, etc.) c. 2
 (Administration of justice) c. 3
 (False entries of pleas, etc.) c. 4
 (Jurisdiction of constable and marshal) c. 5

1385 (9 Ric. 2)

 (Confirmation of statutes, legal proceedings, Marshalsea) cc. 1–5

1386 (10 Ric. 2)

 (Commission of inquiry into courts, etc.) c. 1

1387 (11 Ric. 2)

 (Confirmation of 10 Ric. 2, indemnity, etc.) cc. 1–11

1388 (12 Ric. 2)

 (Confirmation of liberties, etc.) c. 1
 (Corrupt appointments to offices) c. 2
 (Labourers, beggars) cc. 3–9
 (Justices of the Peace quarter sessions) c. 10
 (Penalty for slandering great men) c. 11
 (Expenses of knights of shires) c. 12
 (Nuisances in towns) c. 13
 (Cloths) c. 14
 (Provisors of benefices) c. 15
 (The staple) c. 16

1389

13 Ric. 2 Stat. 1

 (King's presentation to benefice) c. 1
 (Jurisdiction of constable and marshal) c. 2
 (Court of Marshalsea) c. 3
 (Clerk of market of King's house) c. 4
 (Jurisdiction of admiral and deputy) c. 5
 (Sergeants at arms) c. 6
 (Justice of the Peace) c. 7
 (Labourer's wages, etc.) c. 8
 (Measure and weight) c. 9
 (Cloths) cc. 10, 11
 (Tanners) c. 12
 (Keeping of dogs to hunt, etc.) c. 13
 (Bonds to the Crown) c. 14
 (Uniting of castles and gaols to counties) c. 15
 (Protections) c. 16
 (Real actions) c. 17
 (Attaints) c. 18
 (Fish) c. 19
 (Going beyond sea) c. 20

13 Ric. 2 Stat. 2

 (Pardon of offences) c. 1
 (Enforcement of the Statute of Provisors) cc. 2, 3

13 Ric. 2 Stat. 3

 (Maintenance)

1390 (14 Ric. 2)

 (The staple, trading, customs, money, Justice of the Peace) cc. 1–12

1391 (15 Ric. 2)

This statute says that it was made at Westminster on the morrow after All Souls' Day in 1391.

 (Confirmation of statutes) c. 1 — this chapter was repealed for England and Wales by the Statute Law Revision Act 1863, and for Ireland by the Statute Law (Ireland) Revision Act 1872
 Statutes concerning forcible entries and riots confirmed or the Forcible Entry Act 1391 c. 2 - repealed for England and Wales and the Republic of Ireland
 Admiralty Jurisdiction Act 1391 c. 3 - repealed for England and Wales
 (Measures) c. 4 — this chapter was repealed for England and Wales by the Statute Law Revision Act 1863, and for Ireland by the Statute Law (Ireland) Revision Act 1872
 (Mortmain) c. 5 — this chapter was repealed by the Mortmain and Charitable Uses Act 1888, s. 13
 (Appropriation of benefices) c. 6 — this chapter was repealed for Northern Ireland by the Statute Law Revision Act 1950, and for England and Wales by the Statute Law (Repeals) Act 1969
 (Exportation) cc. 7, 8 — this chapter was repealed for England and Wales by the Statute Law Revision Act 1863, and for Ireland by the Statute Law (Ireland) Revision Act 1872
 (The staple) c. 9 — this chapter was repealed for England and Wales by the Statute Law Revision Act 1863, and for Ireland by the Statute Law (Ireland) Revision Act 1872
 (Cloths) c. 10 — this chapter was repealed for England and Wales by the Statute Law Revision Act 1863, and for Ireland by the Statute Law (Ireland) Revision Act 1872
 (Girdlers) c. 11 — this chapter was repealed for Ireland by the Statute Law (Ireland) Revision Act 1872
 (Private courts) c. 12 — this chapter was repealed for England and Wales by the Statute Law Revision Act 1863, and for Ireland by the Statute Law (Ireland) Revision Act 1872

1392 (16 Ric. 2)

 Statute of Praemunire 1392:
 (Trade) c. 1
 (Confirmation, etc. of 15 Rich. 2 c. 12) c. 2
 (Weights and measures) c. 3
 (Liveries) c. 4
 c. 5. Recital that the Remedy to recover Presentations to Benefices is in the King's Court, and that the Execution thereof is by the Bishop. — this chapter, which at the time was the only unrepealed part of this statute, was formally given the short title of "Statute of Praemunire" by the Statute Law Revision Act 1948
 (Pardon) c. 6

1393 (17 Ric. 2)

 (Money) c. 1
 (Cloths) c. 2
 (Exportation of worsted) c. 3
 (Malt) c. 4
 (Revenue officers) c. 5
 (Untrue suggestions in Chancery) c. 6
 (Exportation of corn) c. 7
 (Suppressions of riots) c. 8
 (Fish) c. 9
 (Gaol delivery) c. 10
 (London aldermen) c. 11
 (Erroneous judgments in London) c. 12
 (Farringdon Without) c. 13

1396 (20 Ric. 2)

 (Riding armed, liveries, justices of assize, etc.) cc. 1–6

1397 (21 Ric. 2)

 (Confirmation of liberties and franchises, repeal of 10 Rich. 2, treasons, etc.) cc. 1–20

Henry IV (1399–1413)

1399 (1 Hen. 4)

 (Confirmation of liberties, charters and statutes, indemnity, repeal of 21 Rich. 2, petitions to the King for lands, etc.) cc. 1–20

1400 (2 Hen. 4)

 (Confirmation of liberties, etc.) c. 1
 (Petitions to the King for lands) c. 2
 (Extension of the Statute of Provisors) c. 3
 (Purchasing bulls to be discharged of tithes) c. 4
 (Exportation of gold or silver) c. 5
 (Foreign coin) c. 6
 (No nonsuit after verdict) c. 7
 (Fines) c. 8
 (Relief of certain commissioners) c. 9
 (Clerk of the Crown, Queen's Bench) c. 10
 (Admiralty jurisdiction) c. 11
 (Welshmen) c. 12
 (Pardon) c. 13
 (Purveyance) c. 14
 De heretico comburendo 1401 (suppressions of heresy) c. 15
 (Wales and Welshmen) cc. 16–18
 (Wales) c. 19
 (Welshmen) c. 20
 (Liveries) c. 21
 (Suits for pardon) c. 22
 (Marshalsea court) c. 23
 (Wages for serving with Duke of York) c. 24

1402 (4 Hen. 4)

 (Confirmation of liberties, etc.) c. 1
 (Indictments, etc.) c. 2
 Benefit of Clergy Act 1402 c. 3
 (Crown grants) c. 4
 (Sheriffs) c. 5
 (Cloths) c. 6
 (Real actions) c. 7
 (Forcible entries) c. 8
 (Relief of commissioners) c. 9
 (Coinage) c. 10
 (Weirs) c. 11
 (Enforcement of 15 Rich. 2 c. 6) c. 12
 (Military service) c. 13
 (Labourers) c. 14
 (Exportation of gold and silver) c. 15
 (Exportation of gold and silver) c. 16
 (Monastic orders) c. 17
 (Attorneys) c. 18
 (Attorneys) c. 19
 (Customs) c. 20
 (Customs) c. 21
 (King's presentation to benefices) c. 22
 (Judgments) c. 23
 (Cloths) c. 24
 (Hostlers) c. 25
 (Wales) cc. 26–28
 (Welshmen) c. 29
 (Wales) c. 30
 (Wales and Welshmen) cc. 31–34
 (Tanning) c. 35

1403 (5 Hen. 4)

 (Certain traitors' lands (not forfeited if seized to uses)) c. 1
 (Approvers) c. 2
 (Watching) c. 3
 (Gold and silver) c. 4
 (Maiming) c. 5
 (Assaulting servants of knights of parliament) c. 6
 (Merchant strangers) c. 7
 (Wager of law) c. 8
 (Trade) c. 9
 (Imprisonment by Justice of the Peace) c. 10
 (Payment of tithes of aliens' lands) c. 11
 (Execution on statute merchant) c. 12
 (Plating) c. 13
 (Fines) c. 14
 (Pardon) c. 15

1404 (6 Hen. 4)

 (First fruits, petitions to the King for lands, sheriffs, escheators, etc.) cc. 1–4

1405 (7 Hen. 4)

 (Confirmation of liberties) c. 1 — this chapter is still in force
 (Succession to the Crown) c. 2
 (Fines and forfeitures) c. 3
 (Protections) c. 4
 (Lands of Percy and Bardolf (not forfeited if seized to uses)) c. 5
 (Bulls to be discharged of tithes) c. 6
 (Arrow heads) c. 7
 (Benefices) c. 8
 (Sales in gross, London) c. 9
 (Cloths) c. 10
 (Relief of commissioners) c. 11
 (Certain traitors' lands (not forfeited if seized to uses)) c. 12
 (Attorneys in outlawry) c. 13
 (Liveries) c. 14
 (Election of knights of shires) c. 15
 (Annuities from the Crown) c. 16
 (Labourers) c. 17 - among other things it penalised "every town or seignory that faileth of their stocks, so that they be not made before the feast of Easter next coming". It was repealed by the Statute Law Revision Act 1863.
 (Pardon) c. 18

1407 (9 Hen. 4)

 (Confirmation of liberties, charters, and statutes, aulnage, etc.) cc. 1–10

1409 (11 Hen. 4)

 (Justices of assize, customers, etc.) cc. 1–9
 c. 4 prohibits the following games as unlawful — "balls as well handball as football and other games called coits, dice, bowling, calls, and other such unthrifty games."

1411 (13 Hen. 4)

 (Confirmation of liberties, charters, and statutes, justices of assize, etc.) cc. 1–6
 Riot Act 1411 c. 7

Henry V (1413–1422)

1413 (1 Hen. 5)

 (Parliamentary elections) c. 1
 (Weirs) c. 2
 (Forgery) c. 3
 (Bailiffs of sheriffs, etc.) c. 4
 (Statute of Additions (details on original writs and indictments)) c. 5
 (Wales) c. 6
 (Restraint of aliens holding benefices) c. 7
 (Irish mendicants, etc.) c. 8
 (Grants of revenues, etc. of Calais) c. 9
 (Corn measure) c. 10

1414

2 Hen. 5 Stat. 1

 (Visitation of hospitals) c. 1
 (Certiorari) c. 2
 (Libels in spiritual courts) c. 3
 (Sessions (quarter)) c. 4
 (Outrages in certain franchises) c. 5
 Safe Conducts Act 1414 c. 6
 Suppression of Heresy Act 1414 c. 7
 Riot Act 1414 c. 8
 (Murder, etc.) c. 9

2 Hen. 5 Stat. 2

 (Qualifications of justices of the peace, chaplains, jurors, etc.) cc. 1–6

1415

3 Hen. 5

 (Money) c. 1
 Treason Act 1415 c.6

4 Hen. 5 Stat. 1

This statute was traditionally cited as 3 Hen. 5 stat. 2

 (Attorneys, Bretons, provisors) cc. 1–8

1416 (4 Hen. 5 Stat. 2)

This statute was traditionally cited as 4 Hen. 5

 (Confirmation of charters and statutes) c. 1 — this chapter is still in force
 (Sheriffs, pattens, wages, merchant strangers, etc.) cc. 2–8

1417 (5 Hen. 5)

 (Attorneys)

1419 (7 Hen. 5)

 (Indictments, forgery)

1420 (8 Hen. 5)

 (Parliament, gold and silver) cc. 1–3

1421

9 Hen. 5 Stat. 1

 (Indictments, etc.) c. 1
 (Outlawries) c. 2
 (Assizes, protection, etc.) c. 3
 (Amendment) c. 4
 (Sheriffs, etc.) c. 5
 (Mint at Calais) c. 6
 (Offenders in the Franchise of Ridesdale) c. 7
 (Offences by scholars of Oxford) c. 8
 (Abbots, etc.) c. 9
 (Coal-keels at Newcastle) c. 10
 (Gold coin) c. 11
 (Rochester bridge) c. 12

9 Hen. 5 Stat. 2

 (Money, exchanges, tithes, repair of roads and bridges between Abingdon and Dorchester) cc. 1–11

Henry VI (1422–1461)

1422 (1 Hen. 6)

 (Mint, exchanges, purveyance, Irishmen, etc.) cc. 1–6

1423 (2 Hen. 6)

 (Confirmation of liberties) c. 1 — this chapter is still in force
 (St Leonard's Hospital, York (thrave of corn)) c. 2
 (Duke of Bedford) c. 3
 (The staple) c. 4
 (Exportation of wools) c. 5
 (Exportation of gold or silver) c. 6
 (Tanners) c. 7
 (Irishmen) c. 8
 (Currency) c. 9
 (Embroidery) c. 10
 (Certain outlawries) c. 11
 (The Thames) c. 12
 (Patent officers in courts) c. 13
 (Measures) c. 14
 (The Mint) c. 15
 (Price of silver) c. 16
 (Quality and marks of silver work) c. 17
 (Labourers) c. 18
 (Fish) c. 19
 (Real actions) c. 20
 Escape Act 1423 c. 21

1425

3 Hen. 6

 (Labourers) c. 1
 (Exportation of sheep) c. 2
 (Customs) c. 3
 (Exportation of butter, etc.) c. 4
 (River Lea (conservancy commission) c. 5

4 Hen. 6

 (Sheriffs, writs, amendment, corn, continuance of statutes) cc. 1–5

1427 (6 Hen. 6)

 (Exigent on indictment, assizes, wages of artificers, parliament, commissioners of sewers, wool) cc. 1–6

1429 (8 Hen. 6)

"There is no c. 28 in the Statutes of the Realm; see note there, vol. 2 p. 261"

 (Privileges of clergy) c. 1 — this chapter was repealed for Northern Ireland by the Statute Law Revision Act 1950, and for England and Wales by the Statute Law (Repeals) Act 1969
 (Trade with Denmark) c. 2 — this chapter was repealed by 3 Geo. 4 c. 41, s. 10
 (Commissioners of sewers) c. 3 — this chapter was repealed for England and Wales by the Statute Law Revision Act 1863, and for Ireland by the Statute Law (Ireland) Revision Act 1872
 (Liveries) c. 4 — this chapter was repealed for England and Wales by 3 Chas. 1 c. 5, s. 8, and for Ireland by the Statute Law (Ireland) Revision Act 1872
 (Weights, etc.) c. 5 — this chapter was repealed for England and Wales by the Statute Law Revision Act 1863, and for Ireland by the Statute Law (Ireland) Revision Act 1872
 Treason Act 1429 c. 6 — this chapter was repealed for England and Wales by the Statute Law Revision Act 1863, and for Ireland by the Statute Law (Ireland) Revision Act 1872
 (Electors of knights of the shires) c. 7 — this chapter was repealed by the Representation of the People Act 1918, s. 47, sch. 8
 (Labourers) c. 8 — this chapter was repealed for England and Wales by the Statute Law Revision Act 1863, and for Ireland by the Statute Law (Ireland) Revision Act 1872
 Forcible Entry Act 1429 c. 9 — this chapter was repealed for England and Wales by the Criminal Law Act 1977
 (Malicious indictments, etc.) c. 10 — this chapter was repealed for England and Wales by the Administration of Justice (Miscellaneous Provisions) Act 1938, ss. 20(3), 20(5), sch. 4
 (Apprenticeship) c. 11 — this chapter was repealed for England and Wales by the Statute Law Revision Act 1863, and for Ireland by the Statute Law (Ireland) Revision Act 1872
 (Amendment) c. 12 — this chapter was repealed for England and Wales (?) by the Statute Law Revision and Civil Procedure Act 1883, s. 4, and for Northern Ireland by the Statute Law Revision Act 1950
 (Protections) c. 13 — this chapter was repealed for England and Wales by the Statute Law Revision Act 1863, and for Ireland by the Statute Law (Ireland) Revision Act 1872
 (Murders, etc.) c. 14 — this chapter was repealed for England and Wales by the Statute Law Revision Act 1863, and for Ireland by the Statute Law (Ireland) Revision Act 1872
 (Amendment) c. 15 — this chapter was repealed for England and Wales (?) by the Statute Law Revision and Civil Procedure Act 1883, s. 4, and for Northern Ireland by the Statute Law Revision Act 1950
 (Inquests by escheators, etc.) c. 16 — this chapter was repealed by the Escheat (Procedure) Act 1887
 (The staple) c. 17 — this chapter was repealed by 3 Geo. 4 c. 41, s. 5
 (The staple) c. 18 — this chapter was repealed by 3 Geo. 4 c. 41, s. 5
 (Exportation) c. 19 — this chapter was repealed by 3 Geo. 4 c. 41, s. 1
 (Trade with Calais) c. 20 — this chapter was repealed by 3 Geo. 41 c. 41, s. 5
 (Exportation) c. 21 — this chapter was repealed by 3 Geo. 4 c. 41, s. 5
 (Wool) c. 22 — this chapter was repealed by 19 & 20 Vict. c. 64
 (Exportation) c. 23 — this chapter was repealed by 3 Geo. 4 c. 41, s. 3
 (Trade with aliens) c. 24 — this chapter was repealed by 3 Geo. 4 c. 41, s. 1
 (The staple) c. 25 — this chapter was repealed for England and Wales by the Statute Law Revision Act 1863, and for Ireland by the Statute Law (Ireland) Revision Act 1872
 (Franchises) c. 26 — this chapter was repealed for England and Wales by the Statute Law Revision Act 1863, and for Ireland by the Statute Law (Ireland) Revision Act 1872
 (Robberies on the Severn) c. 27 — this chapter was repealed for England and Wales by the Statute Law Revision Act 1863, and for Ireland by the Statute Law (Ireland) Revision Act 1872
 (Inquests) c. 29 — this chapter was repealed for England and Wales by the Statute Law Revision Act 1863, and for Ireland by the Statute Law (Ireland) Revision Act 1872

1430 (9 Hen. 6)

 (Adjournment of assizes) c. 1
 (Trade with aliens) c. 2
 (Proceedings against Owen Glendour made valid (saving for his heirs)) c. 3
 (Indemptitate nominis by executor) c. 4
 (Free passage, Severn) c. 5
 (Weights (Dorchester)) c. 6
 (Sheriff of Herefordshire) c. 7
 (Weight of a wey of cheese) c. 8
 (River Lee (conservancy commission)) c. 9
 (Attorneys) c. 10
 (Bastardy) c. 11

1430 (9 Hen. 6) (Rot. Parl. vol. iv p. 373)

 (Northampton, highways and streets) — this statute was repealed by the Northampton Act 1988 (c. xxix)

1432 (10 Hen. 6)

 (The staple) c. 1
 (Electors of knights of the shire) c. 2
 (Letters of request) c. 3
 (Appearance of plaintiffs) c. 4
 (Beacons, etc., Calais) c. 5
 (8 Hen. 6 c. 10 (indictments) confirmed) c. 6
 (Exportation) c. 7

1432 (10 Hen. 6 Stat. 2)

 (Payment of judges, etc.) — this statute was repealed for England and Wales by the Statute Law Revision Act 1863, and for Ireland by the Statute Law (Ireland) Revision Act 1872

1433 (11 Hen. 6)

 (The stews in Southwark) c. 1
 (Real actions) c. 2
 (Real actions) c. 3
 (Attaints) c. 4
 (Real actions) c. 5
 (Continuance of indictments) c. 6
 (Sheriff of Herefordshire) c. 7
 (Weights and measures) c. 8
 (Cloths) c. 9
 (The staple) c. 10
 (Assaults on lords or commoners, etc.) c. 11
 (Wax chandlers) c. 12
 (The staple) c. 13
 (Exportation) c. 14
 (Customs) c. 15
 (Customs) c. 16

1435 (14 Hen. 6)

 (Judgment in treason and felony) c. 1
 (The staple) c. 2
 (Cumberland assizes to be at Carlisle) c. 3
 (Middlesex sessions) c. 4
 (Exportation) c. 5
 (Alien merchants) c. 6
 (Alien goods) c. 7
 (Breaches of truces) c. 8

1436 (15 Hen. 6)

 (Marshalsea, exportation of corn, safe-conducts, sub-poenas, attaints, etc.) cc. 1–8

1439 (18 Hen. 6)

 (Dating of letters patent) c. 1
 (Attaints) c. 2
 (Exportation) c. 3
 (Alien merchants) c. 4
 (Taxation) c. 5
 (Crown grants) c. 6
 (Penalty on escheators) c. 7
 (Captures at sea) c. 8
 (Appearance of plaintiffs) c. 9
 (Commissions of sewers) c. 10
 (Justices of the Peace) c. 11
 (Indictments, etc.) c. 12
 (Outlawries) c. 13
 (Sheriffs) c. 14
 (Exportation) c. 15
 (Cloths) c. 16
 (Vessels of wine, etc.) c. 17
 (Soldiers) c. 18
 (Soldiers) c. 19

1442 (20 Hen. 6)

 (Safe conducts, outlawries, etc.) cc. 1; 2; 4–8, 10–12
 Treason Act 1442 c. 3
 Peeresses Act 1441 c. 9

1444 (23 Hen. 6)

 (Purveyance) c. 1
 (Exportation) c. 2
 (Worsteds) c. 3
 (Welshmen) c. 4
 (Exportation) c. 5
 (Sheriffs of Northumberland) c. 6
 (Sheriffs (tenure of office)) c. 7
 (Commissions of sewers) c. 8
 (Sheriffs and bailiffs, fees, etc.) c. 9
 (Wages of knights of the shire) c. 10
 (Foreign pleas) c. 11
 (Labourers) c. 12
 (Purveyance) c. 13
 (Parliamentary elections) c. 14
 (Gauge penny) c. 15
 (Escheators) c. 16
 (Wines) c. 17

1447 (25 Hen. 6)

 (Wales)

1448 (27 Hen. 6)

 (Importation, exportation, etc.) cc. 1–4, 6
 Sunday Fairs Act 1448 c. 5

1449 (28 Hen. 6)

 (Importation, purveyance, pardon, etc.) c. 1 - 5

1450 (29 Hen. 6)

 (John Cade (deceased) attainted of treason) c. 1
 (Safe conducts) c. 2
 (York (exemption from municipal office)) c. 3

1452 (31 Hen. 6)

 (John Cade, writs, attachments, safe conducts, etc.) cc. 1–9

1455 (33 Hen. 6)

 (Embezzlement, repeal of 31 Hen. 6 c. 6, jurors, exchequer, etc.) cc. 1–7
Importation Act 1455

1460 (39 Hen. 6)

 (Repeal of 38 Hen. 6, etc.) cc. 1, 2
 Act of Accord 1460

Edward IV (1461–1483)

1461 (1 Edw. 4)

 (Acts done in times of Hen. 4, Hen. 5, and Hen. 6) c. 1
 (Sheriff's tourn) c. 2

1463 (3 Edw. 4)

 (Exportation, importation, apparel) cc. 1–5
Importation Act 1463
Importation of Silk Act 1463

1464 (4 Edw. 4)

 (Cloths, trade, etc.) Edward IV – Stat. 4, Required a lead seal with a stamp on both sides showing the sign of the county, city or borough where it was made, its length, and faults to be marked with another -  ‘a seal of lead shall be hanged on the lowest part of the edge thereof’  ... (Broad cloth to be 24 yds with a man's inch to be added for every yard ‘measured by the (cheft) chest’ and in breadth 2 yds or 7 quarters at the least within the lifts. It is still known to measure a rough yard from centre of chest to hand unfolding the cloth)

1467 (7 Edw. 4)

 (Worsted, cloths, Crown grants) cc. 1–5

1468 (8 Edw. 4)

 (Cloths, liveries, juries, sheriffs) cc. 1–4

1472 (12 Edw. 4)

 (Sheriff (execution of writs, etc.), bowstaves, subsidiaries, liveries, wool, commissions of sewers, etc.) cc. 1–9

1474 (14 Edw. 4)

 (King's tenants, protections, wool, etc.) cc. 1–4

1477 (17 Edw. 4)

 (Currency, etc.) c. 1
 (Courts of pyepowder) c. 2
 (Unlawful games) c. 3
 (Tiles) c. 4
 (Cloths) c. 5
 (Repeal of Acts, etc.) c. 6
 (Sheriffs (execution of writs, etc.)) c. 7

1482 (22 Edw. 4)

 (Apparel) c. 1
 (Fish) c. 2
Importation Act 1482
 (Price of bows) c. 4
 (Fulling mills) c. 5
 (Swans) c. 6
 (Forest) c. 7
 (Berwick) c. 8

Richard III (1483–1485)

1483 (1 Ric. 3)

 Titulus Regius'' — this enactment is not listed in the "Chronological Table of the Statutes"
 (Feoffments to uses) c. 1
 (Benevolences) c. 2
 (Felony) c. 3
 (Sheriff's tourns) c. 4
 (King Rich. 3, feoffee to uses) c. 5
 (Courts of pyepowder) c. 6
 (Fines) c. 7
 (Cloths) c. 8
 (Aliens) c. 9
 (Importations) c. 10
 (Bowstaves) c. 11
 (Importation) c. 12
 (Vessels of wine, etc.) c. 13
 (Collector of dismes) c. 14
 (Letters patent to Elizabeth, late Queen of England, annulled) c. 15

See also
List of Acts of the Parliament of England

Notes

References
The UK Statute Law Database
Chronological Tables of Local Acts and of Private and Personal Acts

External links
Christ Church college, Oxford University chch.ox.ac.uk website   descriptions of statutes written on calfskin [Retrieved 2011-12-17]
The Statutes at Large
- Volume 1 - Magna Charta to 14 Edward III - 1225 to 1340 - also
- Volume 2 - 15 Edward III to 13 Henry IV - 1341 to 1411 - also
- Volume 3 - 1 Henry V to 22 Edward IV - 1413 to 1482-3 - also
- Volume 4 - 1 Richard III to 31 Henry VIII - 1483-4 to 1539 - also - also

13th century in England
14th century in England
15th century in England
1194
Medieval English law
Political history of medieval England